Eberhard III of Württemberg (called der Milde (the Clement) (1364 – 16 May 1417, in Göppingen), ruled from 1392 to 1417 as the Count of Württemberg, then a part of the Holy Roman Empire.

Life

He was a son of Count Ulrich of Württemberg and Elisabeth of Bavaria (who was the daughter of the emperor Louis IV), and the grandson and successor of Eberhard II. His reign was noted by a peace-preserving policy of alliances with the neighboring principalities and imperial towns. Examples are an alliances with 14 Upper-Swabian towns, concluded 27 August 1395 and the Marbachs alliance in 1405. An important military success was the victory against the Schlegel-Gesellschaft in 1395 near Heimsheim. Eberhard's most significant territorial acquisition was the county of Mömpelgard (now Montbéliard), which he secured through the engagement of his son, the later count Eberhard IV with Henriette, Countess of Montbéliard. Henriette was the granddaughter and heiress of Stephen of Montfaucon, count of Mömpelgard. Eberhard III governed the county of Mömpelgard till 1409, when he handed it over to his son Eberhard IV.

Family and children
He was married twice. Firstly, in Urach on 27 October 1380 with Antonia Visconti, daughter of Bernabò Visconti. They had had 3 sons: Eberhard IV and two others, who died young.

Secondly, he married Elisabeth of Nuremberg (1391–1429), the daughter of John III, Burgrave of Nuremberg. The marriage agreement was dated 27 March 1406, and the marriage itself on 22 November 1412. In this marriage he had one daughter, Elisabeth (d. after 29 April 1476), who, though engaged to Albert III, Duke of Bavaria, eloped and married Count John IV of Werdenberg (before 2 August 1429 ) who had served as a page at her father's court.

See also
 History of Württemberg
 List of rulers of Württemberg

Notes

This article is translated from that on the German Wikipedia

1364 births
1417 deaths
14th-century counts of Württemberg
15th-century counts of Württemberg
Burials at Stiftskirche, Stuttgart